KGV can refer to:

 George V, King of Britain
 One of two King George V-class battleship classes (KGV class)
 King George V-class battleship (1911), a class of four Royal Navy battleships that served in World War I
 King George V-class battleship (1939), a class of five Royal Navy battleships that served in World War II
 TS King George V, the turbine ship KGV
 King George V School (disambiguation)
 King George V College
 King George V School (Hong Kong)
 King George V Park in Newfoundland
 KGV Oval in Tasmania
 the ISO 639-3 code for Karas language
 the railway station code for Kingsgrove railway station
 the aviation waypoint, 23° 40' 47S 22° 49' 12E

See also
 George V (disambiguation)